The 2022–23 season is the 99th season in the history of Gil Vicente F.C. and their fourth consecutive season in the top flight. The club participate in the Primeira Liga, the Taça de Portugal, the Taça da Liga, and the UEFA Europa Conference League, where they were eliminated in the play-off round.

Players

Out on loan

Transfers

Pre-season and friendlies

Competitions

Overall record

Primeira Liga

League table

Results summary

Results by round

Matches 
The league fixtures were announced on 5 July 2022.

Taça de Portugal

Taça da Liga

UEFA Europa Conference League

Third qualifying round 
The draw for the third qualifying round was held on 18 July 2022.

Play-off round 
The draw for the play-off round was held on 2 August 2022.

References

Gil Vicente F.C. seasons
Gil Vicente
Gil Vicente